Terence Lee (1964–), born Yoshiteru Katō , is a Japanese comedian. He is a self-styled ex-mercenary who claims to have been scouted as mercenary in the United Kingdom, and to have worked as a gifted sniper.

On December 9, 2009, it was reported that he was severely injured by a drunkard attack, which occurred around Sagamihara Station.

References 

Japanese comedians
Living people
1964 births